Poggioreale (Sicilian: Poggiuriali) is a ghost town and comune in the province of Trapani, western Sicily, southern Italy, located in the Belice valley. The Economy was mostly based on agriculture and fruit cultivation.

Earthquake: The Belice Valley earthquake destroyed the entire town of Poggioreale and killed 200 people in 1968. Eventually the town was rebuilt in a safer place a few kilometers south. Some of the families moved to the USA, according to a CNN article. Mayor Girolamo Cangelosi wants to bring Poggioreale back to its former glory. Some of the former residents and their families have been on organized tours of Poggioreale. They reunited using social media and the internet. According to the New York Post, Sicilians call it their modern Pompeii. Unfortunately Mayor Girolamo Cangelosi was seriously injured in an auto accident. It remains unclear what effect this may have upon his reconstruction efforts.

References
 

Municipalities of the Province of Trapani
Destroyed towns